Take Cover is the tenth studio album by Seattle-based progressive metal band Queensrÿche, released on November 13, 2007. It consists of cover versions. The idea to release an album of cover songs came from a game of "name the riff" guitarists Michael Wilton and Mike Stone would play during sound checks. The band members agreed to each choose two songs to record for the album. Its release was announced by the band on August 28, 2007. After its first week of release the album entered the Billboard Top 200 chart at No. 173, with sales of 5,500 copies. Their cover of Pink Floyd's "Welcome to the Machine" was released as the album's only single.

Take Cover was the last album to feature Mike Stone for fifteen years. He left the band in 2009, but returned in 2018 and played on the 2022 album Digital Noise Alliance.

Track listing

Personnel 
Queensrÿche
 Geoff Tate – vocals
 Michael Wilton – lead guitar, rhythm guitar (on tracks 1-10)
 Mike Stone – lead guitar (on tracks 1-10), rhythm guitar
 Eddie Jackson – bass
 Scott Rockenfield – drums

Additional personnel
 Kelly Gray – rhythm guitar (on track 11)
 Leopoldo Larsen – keyboards

Production
Jason Slater – producer, engineering
Michael Wilton – production
Mike Stone – production
Kelly Gray – engineering, mixing
Leopoldo Larsen – assistant engineering
Kenny Nemes – executive production
Eddy Schreyer – mastering

Charts

References 

Queensrÿche albums
2007 albums
Rhino Records albums
Covers albums
Albums produced by Jason Slater